Kigoowa is a location within the city of Kampala, Uganda's capital.

Location
Located in Nakawa Division, Kigoowa is bordered by Kulambiro to the north, Kiwaatule to the east, Ntinda to the south, Naguru and Bukoto to the southwest and Kyebando to the west.

Demographics
Prior to the construction of the Kampala Northern Bypass Highway, Kigoowa was primarily a bedroom community of middle-class single family homes. Those homes became more upscale when Ntinda became a major commercial location within the city of Kampala, during the 1990s and early 2000s. With the construction of the Northern Bypass, commercial construction has begun to appear along the highway, and at street junctions.

Points of interest
The following points of interest lie in or near Kigoowa:
 The Kampala Northern Bypass Highway - Passes between Kulambiro to the north and Kigoowa to the south
 Kalinaabiri Primary School
 Saint Andrew Kaggwa Church - The Catholic church for Kigoowa Parish; named after St. Andrew Kaggwa, one of the Uganda Martyrs.
 Kigoowa Infants Primary School
 Kigoowa Catholic Women's Development Association 
 St. Yosefu Church of Uganda
 Kigoowa Office of Uganda Women's Network
 Harvest Miracle Centre Kigoowa - A place of worship affiliated with the Pentecostal Movement

See also

References

Neighborhoods of Kampala
Nakawa Division